Deolinda Ngulela (born April 18, 1981) is a Mozambican female professional basketball player.

External links
Profile at fiba.com

1981 births
Living people
Sportspeople from Maputo
Mozambican women's basketball players
Shooting guards